Sleeper House may refer to:

Beauport (Gloucester, Massachusetts), also known as the Sleeper–McCann House
Albert E. Sleeper House, Bad Axe, Michigan
Charles H. Moore–Albert E. Sleeper House, Lexington, Michigan